The Dakota Watch Company is an American retail and service company that specializes in watches and watch accessories. The company was founded in 1945 by Albert Cooper under the name Cooper's Fixery in Cincinnati, Ohio. At the time, the company's products consisted mostly of a variety of services ranging from scissor sharpening to watch repair. In 1985 the company changed its focus to watches (both sales and repair) and was accordingly renamed Cooper's Watchworks (Cooper's Watch World in some locations).

Since the early 1990s, Dakota has been designing their own watches under the direction of Martin Cooper (Albert's son). 

In 1999 the company was again renamed, this time as Dakota Watch Company. The company is  currently operated by brothers David and Martin Cooper with around 100 Dakota Watch Company retail locations in shopping malls across the United States. Dakota remains one of the largest watch retailers based in the United States.  In addition to mall locations, The Dakota brand is also sold in hundreds of outdoor specialty shops across the world.

Brands

The Dakota Watch Company creates timepieces under the following brand names:
 Dakota
 Berenger
 Fusion
 Jean Paul
 Moxie

In addition to watches, the Dakota company also designs and manufactures steel, leather, rubber, and copper jewelry and watch bands.

At larger locations, Dakota kiosks sell other brand names as well, such as Kenneth Cole and Timex. Since Dakota has a partnership with Citizen, kiosks carry and warranty Q&Q brand watches (the sister company of Citizen) as well.

References

Watch brands
Watch manufacturing companies of the United States
Retail companies of the United States
Companies based in Cincinnati
Manufacturing companies based in Cincinnati
1945 establishments in Ohio
Manufacturing companies established in 1945
Retail companies established in 1945